This list of tallest buildings in Europe by year ranks the tallest buildings in Europe by year according to height. Only the ten tallest buildings are included for all decades other than those buildings currently tallest in Europe. The current tallest building in Europe is the Lakhta Center in Saint Petersburg, Russia, which rises  and was completed in 2018.

Current tallest 
This is a list of the tallest completed buildings in Europe. Heights are measured to the structural height, which includes architectural elements, but not communications spires or antennas. All measurements are according to the Council on Tall Buildings and Urban Habitat. Only the tallest 20 completed buildings in Europe are included.

Historical tallest 
This is a list of the tallest completed buildings in Europe at the end of recent decades. Heights are measured to the structural height, which includes architectural elements, but not communications spires or antennas. All measurements are according to the Council on Tall Buildings and Urban Habitat. Only the tallest 10 completed buildings in Europe are included in each section.

2000s

1990s

1980s

1970s

1960s

1950s

Timeline of tallest buildings

See also 
List of tallest buildings in Europe
List of tallest buildings in the European Union
List of tallest buildings in the World

References

 Skyscraper Center (Detailed information on specific buildings)

Monuments and memorials in Europe
Skyscrapers in Europe
 
Lists by year
Years in Europe